Konohana may refer to:
Konohana, the Japanese name of the Pokémon Nuzleaf
"Konohana", the Japanese title of [[xxxHolic: Kei#ep30|episode 6 of xxxHolic: Kei]]
Konohana Arena, an arena in Shizuoka, Shizuoka, Japan
Konohana Bridge, a self-anchored suspension bridge located in Osaka, Japan
Konohana-ku, one of the 24 wards of Osaka City, Japan